Majnun or Majnoon may refer to:
 Majnun, Bushehr
 Majnun, Khuzestan
 Majnun-e Olya, West Azerbaijan Province
 Majnun-e Sofla, West Azerbaijan Province